Crni Vrh means "black peak" in Bosnian-Croatian-Serbian. It may refer to:


Populated places
 Crni Vrh, Berane, a village in Berane Municipality, Montenegro
 Crni Vrh (Čelinac), a village in Čelinac Municipality, Bosnia and Herzegovina
 Crni Vrh (Glamoč), a village in Glamoč Municipality, Bosnia and Herzegovina
 Crni Vrh (Knjaževac), a village in Knjaževac Municipality, Serbia
 Crni Vrh, Konjic, a village in Konjic Municipality, Bosnia and Herzegovina
 Crni Vrh (Medveđa), a village in Medveđa Municipality, Serbia
 Crni Vrh, Pljevlja, a village in Pljevlja Municipality, Montenegro
 Crni Vrh, Sarajevo, neighborhood in Centar, Sarajevo, Bosnia and Herzegovina
 Crni Vrh (Višegrad), a village in Višegrad Municipality, Bosnia and Herzegovina
 Crni Vrh, Vranje, a village in Vranje Municipality, Serbia

Mountains
 Crni Vrh (Bor), a mountain near Bor, Serbia
 Crni Vrh (Brod), a mountain near Brod, Kosovo
 Crni Vrh (Jagodina), a mountain near Jagodina, Serbia
 Crni Vrh (Priboj), a mountain in southwestern Serbia
 Crni Vrh (Zvornik), a mountain near Zvornik, Bosnia and Herzegovina

Other
 Crni Vrh mass grave, a mass grave on Zvornik's Mount Crni Vrh containing the remains of 629 Bosnian Muslim victims killed by Serbs in the 1990s

See also
 Črni Vrh (disambiguation), Slovenian equivalent
 List of mountains in Serbia, comprehensive list of peaks named "Crni vrh"